João Pinheiro Chagas (1 September 1863 – 28 May 1925) was a Portuguese politician, literary critic, propagandist, editor, and journalist. He was heavily involved in several rebellions condemning the monarchy and disseminating materials via pamphlets and newspaper in support of  the Portuguese Republican Party. He was among the leaders of the 5 October 1910 revolution and the Lisbon Regicide, and later served as Ambassador to Paris for 14 years and twice as interim prime minister of the Portuguese First Republic.

Biography

Early years
Chagas was born 4 September 1863 in Rio de Janeiro, Empire of Brazil to João Pinheiro Chagas and Maria Amélia Rosa Pereira. His father was a Portuguese emigrant with ancestral ties to Portuguese refugees from Beiras who fled to Brazil during the Liberal Wars. On his paternal side, Manuel Pinheiro Chagas was his cousin and his son Mário was his first cousin once removed. His mother was an Indigenous American. The family relocated to Lisbon when Chagas was a child and he was orphaned at a young age.

Writing career
Chagas could not afford to attend university, so he moved to Porto at age 16 and began his writing career. At times, he wrote under the pseudonym João Rimanso or Ivan. His first publication was in O Primeiro de Janeiro in Porto; he later moved back to Lisbon to collaborate with Temps, Correio da Manhã, and O Diá.

At the end of the 19th century, Chagas founded La Marseillaise (1896—1898), O Berro (1896), Branco e Negro (1896—1898), A Paródia (1900—1907), and A República Portuguesa, and became director of Brazilian newspaper O Paiz (1898) and the Portuguese publications A Lanterna (1899) and Batalha (1900). While incarcerated in Angola, he headed the prison's newspaper (1896—1897). La Marseillaise closed in 1898 due to censorship laws and Chagas' known allegiance to the Republican Party. When he returned from exile, he founded A Portuguesa (1893), which he considered a revival of La Marseillaise.

All of the newspapers he founded, directed, and contributed to were anti-monarchy propaganda tools; his articles were extremely controversial and led to him being arrested several times.

Political activism
During his early years in Porto, he met and befriended several members of Life's Vanquished. He became more critical and more deeply involved with the Republican Party as a result. In 1891, he published an article in A República Portuguesa that was controversial enough to get him arrested and jailed for 10 days. Within days, he participated in and helped plan a rebellion, and his sentence was increased to 4 years in prison or 6 years in exile.  Chagas was originally bound for Luanda but was transferred to Moçâmedes after one day. He escaped within a few months and traveled to Paris before returning to Portugal in 1892, where he was arrested again. While in prison, he continued petition against governmental oppression of rights and wrote extensively about his experiences, making him the only primary source from a Portuguese prisoner from that period.

He was freed from prison in 1893 due to an amnesty resulting from the 1890 British Ultimatum. He lived in Porto, Brazil, and Madrid for varying lengths of time before being arrested again in 1896, and again in 1908 for his involvement in the Lisbon Regicide.  He participated in the 5 October 1910 revolution not long after.

Political career
The Portuguese First Republic was established in 1910, and Chagas' governmental career began. His first role was an ambassador to Paris; he did, however, resign twice due to political disagreements with his supervisors. He served as both prime minister and Interior Minister for 70 days in late 1911 and again in 1915. While in Paris, he continued to keep a critical eye on Portugal's political decision-making. During the Republic's early days, Chagas met with Sir Lancelot Carnegie of Britain, Portuguese War Minister Freire de Andrade, and French diplomat Émile Daeschner to keep himself informed. He was very critical of Portugal's lack of involvement when World War I broke out and was one of the delegates who led the Republic to join the war in 1916.

Final years and death
Following the 1915 May 14 Revolt, Chagas was nominated to succeed Manuel de Arriaga's role as president of Portugal. Senator João José de Freitas disagreed with this decision and attempted to assassinated him. He shot several times at a car Chagas was traveling in with his wife in Entroncamento. Chagas' head was shaved and he lost an eye in the attack. He withdrew from politics during his recovery and turned down the presidential nomination, preferring instead to continue working as an ambassador in Paris. He kept this role until he retired in 1924, with the exception of 1917—1918 during the period of Sidónism. Chagas died on 28 May 1925 in Estoril, Cascais, Portugal.

He died of aortitis and is buried in the Alto de São João Cemetery.

Honours
Chagas served as part of the Portuguese delegation at the Versailles Peace Conference and the League of Nations. He was also a co-founder of the Portuguese Association of Journalists and the Porto Men of Letters, and became a Freemason in 1896. In 1919, he was awarded a Gold Cross from the Military Order of Saint James of the Sword.

He is the namesake for a road in Lisbon and a garden in Porto.

Bibliography
During his lifetime, Chagas wrote at least 15 books and many more journal articles and pamphlets:
{| class="wikitable plainrowheaders" style="width:100%;"
! width=2% | Year
! width=32% | Original title
! width=32% | Title in English (Approx.)
|-
| 1894 || Diario de um condemnado politico || Diary of a Political Convict 
|-
| rowspan="2" | 1897 || De Bond. Algunas aspectos da civilisaçaõ brasileira || Some aspects of Brazilian culture
|-
| O crime da sociedade || Society's crime 
|-
| 1898 || Na Brecha (Pamphletos) || The Gap (Pamphlets)
|-
| 1900 || Trabalhos forçado  || Forced labour 
|-
| rowspan="2" | 1905 || Bom-Humor || Good spirits 
|-
| Homens e Factos 1902—1904 || Men and Facts 1902—1904
|-
| rowspan="3" | 1906 || As minhas razões || My reasons|-
| Posta-restante (Cartas a toda a genta) || Remaining notes (Letters to everyone|-
| Vida Litteraria (ideias e sensacoes || Literary life: Ideas and sensations|-
| 1907 || João Franco. 1906—1907 || 
|-
| 1908 || 1908. Subsidios criticos para a historia da dictadura || 1908. Critical subsidies for the history of the dictatorship|-
| 1908—1910 || Cartas Politicas || Political notes|-
| rowspan="2" | 1915 || A ultima crise. Comentários a situação da Republica Portuguesa || The last crisis: Comementary on the Portuguese Republic|-
| Portugal perante a Guerra. Subsidios para uma pagina da Historia Nacional || Portugal before the war. Subsidies for a page in National History|-
|}

In 1929, four years after his death, Diario de João Chagas was published. He wrote the prefaces for Guedes d'Oliveira's 1890 Gazetilhas; and Luciano Fataça's 1895 A revolução de Cuba. He co-wrote Historia da revolta do Porto de 31 de Janeiro de 1891 (depoimento de dois cúmplices) with Ex-Tenente Coelho. He was also a translator; works included prose from Jacques Offenbach's operetta Os Bandidos and Adolphe d'Ennery's play Martyr''.

References

1863 births
1925 deaths
Ambassadors of Portugal to France
People from Rio de Janeiro (city)
Portuguese Republican Party politicians
Prime Ministers of Portugal
Foreign ministers of Portugal
Government ministers of Portugal
Portuguese diplomats
Portuguese journalists
Male journalists
19th-century Portuguese writers
19th-century male writers
Grand Crosses of the Order of Saint James of the Sword
Political prisoners
Mestizo people
Political activists
People from Porto
Portuguese escapees
Escapees from Portuguese detention
Portuguese prisoners and detainees
Prisoners and detainees of Portugal
People from Lisbon
People from Paris
League of Nations people
Portuguese Freemasons